There are twenty-two colleges and universities in the U.S. state of South Dakota that are listed under the Carnegie Classification of Institutions of Higher Education. Brookings-based South Dakota State University (SDSU) is the state's largest public university, with a spring 2012 enrollment of 12,725 students. SDSU is governed by the South Dakota Board of Regents, a governing board that also controls the University of South Dakota (USD), which has the second largest enrollment. In addition, the Board controls four other public universities in the state.

USD is the oldest public university in South Dakota, as it has a founding date of 1862. Augustana University, situated in Sioux Falls, is the largest not-for-profit private university with a spring 2012 enrollment of 1,871 students in attendance. Sioux Falls Seminary, a Baptist seminary located in the city of the same name, is the state's smallest post-secondary institution, as it had a spring 2012 enrollment of 141 students. Globe University–Sioux Falls, a for-profit private university, consists of 262 students and is the state's second smallest institution.

The state's only law school, the University of South Dakota School of Law, is accredited by the American Bar Association. USD also contains the state's only medical school, the University of South Dakota Sanford School of Medicine. The majority of South Dakota's post-secondary institutions are accredited by the Higher Learning Commission (HLC). Most are accredited by multiple agencies, such as the National Council for Accreditation of Teacher Education (NCATE), the National Association of Schools of Music (NASM), the Commission on Collegiate Nursing Education (CCNE), and the National League for Nursing (NLNAC).

Extant institutions

Defunct institutions

Key

See also
 List of college athletic programs in South Dakota
 Higher education in the United States
 List of American institutions of higher education

Notes

References

External links
Department of Education listing of accredited institutions in South Dakota

South Dakota
Colleges and universities